is a railway station on the Ōu Main Line in the city of Yokote, Akita Prefecture,  Japan, operated by JR East.

Lines

Station layout
The station consists of two opposed side platform  connected by a footbridge. The station is unattended.

Platforms

History
Yanagita Station opened on November 7, 1926 as a station on the Japanese Government Railways (JGR), serving the village of Sakae. JGR became the Japanese National Railways (JNR) after World War II. The station was absorbed into the JR East network upon the privatization of JNR on April 1, 1987.

The station building was replaced by a temporary structure in August 2017, with a new building completed in December 2017.

Surrounding area
 Sakae Elementary School
 for Sakae village hall

See also
List of railway stations in Japan

References

External links

 JR East Station information 

Railway stations in Japan opened in 1926
Railway stations in Akita Prefecture
Ōu Main Line
Yokote, Akita